The Cambridge Ancient History is a multi-volume work of ancient history from Prehistory to Late Antiquity, published by Cambridge University Press. The first series, consisting of 12 volumes, was planned in 1919 by Irish historian J. B. Bury and published between 1924 and 1939, co-edited by Frank Adcock and Stanley Arthur Cook. The second series was published between 1970 and 2005, consisting of 14 volumes in 19 books.

The Cambridge Ancient History is part of a larger series of works, along with The Cambridge Medieval History and The Cambridge Modern History, intended to cover the entire history of European civilisation.  In the original edition, it was the last in this series to appear, the first volume of the Modern History having been published in 1902, and the first volume of the Medieval History in 1911.  In the second series, however, the Ancient History began to be published before the Medieval History.

Second series

Volumes published
 I part I (1970): Prolegomena and Prehistory – edited by I.E.S. Edwards, C.J. Gadd, N.G.L. Hammond

I part II (1971): Early History of the Middle East – edited by I. E. S. Edwards, C. J. Gadd, N. G. L. Hammond

II part I: History of the Middle East and the Aegean Region c.1800-1380 – edited by I. E. S. Edwards, C. J. Gadd, N. G. L. Hammond, L. Sollberger

II part II: History of the Middle East and the Aegean Region c.1380-1000
III part I: The Prehistory of the Balkans; and the Middle East and the Aegean world, tenth to eighth centuries B.C.
III part II: The Assyrian and Babylonian Empires and other States of the Near East, from the Eighth to the Sixth Centuries B.C.
III part III: The Expansion of the Greek World, Eighth to Sixth Centuries B.C. – edited by John Boardman, N. G. L. Hammond
IV: Persia, Greece and the Western Mediterranean C. 525 to 479 B.C.
V: The Fifth Century B.C.
VI: The Fourth Century B.C.
VII part I: The Hellenistic World
VII part II: The Rise of Rome to 220 B.C.
VIII: Rome and the Mediterranean to 133 B.C.
IX: The Last Age of the Roman Republic, 146-43 B.C.
X: The Augustan Empire, 43 B.C.-A.D. 69
XI: The High Empire, A.D. 70-192
XII: The Crisis of Empire, A.D. 193–337
XIII: The Late Empire, A.D. 337–425
XIV: Late Antiquity: Empire and Successors, A.D. 425–600

See also
 The Cambridge Medieval History
 The Cambridge Modern History

References

External links
Page at Cambridge University Press website
archive.org



History books about ancient Greece
History books about ancient Rome
Cambridge University Press books
Cambridge